Disneyland is a theme park in Anaheim, California. Opened in 1955, it was the first theme park opened by The Walt Disney Company and the only one designed and constructed under the direct supervision of Walt Disney. Disney initially envisioned building a tourist attraction adjacent to his studios in Burbank to entertain fans who wished to visit; however, he soon realized that the proposed site was too small for the ideas that he had. After hiring the Stanford Research Institute to perform a feasibility study determining an appropriate site for his project, Disney bought a  site near Anaheim in 1953. The park was designed by a creative team hand-picked by Walt from internal and outside talent. They founded WED Enterprises, the precursor to today's Walt Disney Imagineering. Construction began in 1954 and the park was unveiled during a special televised press event on the ABC Television Network on July 17, 1955. Since its opening, Disneyland has undergone expansions and major renovations, including the addition of New Orleans Square in 1966, Bear Country in 1972, Mickey's Toontown in 1993, and Star Wars: Galaxy's Edge in 2019. Additionally, Disney California Adventure Park opened in 2001 on the site of Disneyland's original parking lot.

Disneyland has a larger cumulative attendance than any other theme park in the world, with 757 million visits since it opened (as of December 2021). In 2018, the park had approximately 18.6 million visits, making it the second most visited amusement park in the world that year, behind only Magic Kingdom, the very park it inspired. According to a 2005 Disney report, 65,700 jobs are supported by the Disneyland Resort, including about 20,000 direct Disney employees and 3,800 third-party employees (independent contractors or their employees). Disney announced "Project Stardust" in 2019, which included major structural renovations to the park to account for higher attendance numbers.

History

20th century

Origins

The concept for Disneyland began when Walt Disney was visiting Griffith Park in Los Angeles with his daughters Diane and Sharon. While watching them ride the merry-go-round, he came up with the idea of a place where adults and their children could go and have fun together, though his dream lay dormant for many years.  The earliest documented draft of Disney's plans was sent as a memo to studio production designer Dick Kelsey on August 31, 1948, where it was referred to as a "Mickey Mouse Park", based on notes Disney made during his and Ward Kimball's trip to the Chicago Railroad Fair the same month, with a two-day stop in Henry Ford's Museum and Greenfield Village, a place with attractions like a Main Street and steamboat rides, which he had visited eight years earlier.

When people wrote letters to Disney to inquire about visiting the Walt Disney Studios, he realized that a functional movie studio had little to offer to visiting fans, and began to foster various ideas about building a site near the Burbank studios for tourists to visit. His ideas evolved to a small play park with a boat ride and other themed areas. The initial park concept, the Mickey Mouse Park, was originally planned for an  plot to the south, across Riverside Drive from the studio. Besides Greenfield Village and the Chicago Railroad Fair, Disney was also inspired by Tivoli Gardens in Denmark, Knott's Berry Farm, Colonial Williamsburg, the Century of Progress in Chicago, and the New York's World Fair of 1939.

His designers began working on concepts, though the project grew much larger than the land could hold. Disney hired Harrison Price from Stanford Research Institute to identify the proper area in which to position the planned theme park based on expected future growth. Based on Price's analysis (for which he would be recognized as a Disney Legend in 2003), Disney acquired  of orange groves and walnut trees in Anaheim, southeast of Los Angeles in neighboring Orange County. The small Burbank site originally considered by Disney is now home to Walt Disney Animation Studios and ABC Studios.

Difficulties in obtaining funding prompted Disney to investigate new methods of fundraising, and he decided to create a show named Disneyland. It was broadcast on then-fledgling ABC. In return, the network agreed to help finance the park. For its first five years of operation, Disneyland was owned by Disneyland, Inc., which was jointly owned by Walt Disney Productions, Walt Disney, Western Publishing and ABC. In addition, Disney rented out many of the shops on Main Street, U.S.A. to outside companies. By 1960, Walt Disney Productions bought out all other shares, but the partnership had already led to a lasting relationship with ABC which would eventually culminate in the Walt Disney Company's acquisition of ABC in the mid-1990s. Construction began on July 16, 1954, and cost $17 million to complete (equivalent to $ in ). The park was opened one year and one day later. U.S. Route 101 (later Interstate 5) was under construction at the same time just north of the site; in preparation for the traffic Disneyland was expected to bring, two more lanes were added to the freeway before the park was finished.

Opening day
Disneyland was dedicated at an "International Press Preview" event held on Sunday, July 17, 1955, which was open only to invited guests and the media. Although 28,000 people attended the event, only about half of those were invitees, the rest having purchased counterfeit tickets, or even sneaked into the park by climbing over the fence. The following day, it opened to the public, featuring twenty attractions. The Special Sunday events, including the dedication, were televised nationwide and anchored by three of Walt Disney's friends from Hollywood: Art Linkletter, Bob Cummings, and Ronald Reagan. ABC broadcast the event live, during which many guests tripped over the television camera cables. In Frontierland, a camera caught Cummings kissing a dancer. When Disney started to read the plaque for Tomorrowland, he read partway then stopped when a technician off-camera said something to him, and after realizing he was on-air, said, "I thought I got a signal", and began the dedication from the start. At one point, while in Fantasyland, Linkletter tried to give coverage to Cummings, who was on the pirate ship. He was not ready and tried to give the coverage back to Linkletter, who had lost his microphone. Cummings then did a play-by-play of him trying to find it in front of Mr. Toad's Wild Ride.

Traffic was delayed on the two-lane Harbor Boulevard. Famous figures who were scheduled to show up every two hours showed up all at once. The temperature was an unusually high , and because of a local plumbers' strike, Disney was given a choice of having working drinking fountains or running toilets. He chose the latter, leaving many drinking fountains dry. This generated negative publicity since Pepsi sponsored the park's opening; disappointed guests believed the inoperable fountains were a cynical way to sell soda, while other vendors ran out of food. The asphalt that had been poured that morning was soft enough to let women's high-heeled shoes sink into it. Some parents threw their children over the crowd's shoulders to get them onto rides, such as the King Arthur Carrousel. In later years, Disney and his 1955 executives referred to July 17, 1955, as "Black Sunday". After the extremely negative press from the preview opening, Walt Disney invited attendees back for a private "second day" to experience Disneyland properly.

At the time, and during the lifetimes of Walt and Roy Disney, July 17 was considered merely a preview, with July 18 the official opening day. Since then, aided by memories of the television broadcast, the company has adopted July 17 as the official date, the one commemorated every year as Disneyland's birthday.

1950s and 1960s

In September 1959, Soviet First Secretary Nikita Khrushchev spent thirteen days in the United States, with two requests: to visit Disneyland and to meet John Wayne, Hollywood's top box-office draw. Due to the Cold War tension and security concerns, he was famously denied an excursion to Disneyland. The Shah of Iran and Empress Farah were invited to Disneyland by Walt Disney in the early 1960s. There was moderate controversy over the lack of African American employees. As late as 1963, civil rights activists were pressuring Disneyland to hire black people, with executives responding that they would "consider" the requests. The park did however hire people of Asian descent, such as Ty Wong and Bob Kuwahara.

As part of the Casa de Fritos operation at Disneyland, "Doritos" (Spanish for "little golden things") were created at the park to recycle old tortillas that would have been discarded. The Frito-Lay Company saw the popularity of the item and began selling them regionally in 1964, and then nationwide in 1966.

1970s
On August 6, 1970, an estimated 300+ anti-war Yippies entered Disneyland in a planned protest against the Vietnam War. The protestors held grievances with specific aspects of the theme park itself, such as the Aunt Jemima-themed pancake restaurant in Frontierland and the park's association with Bank of America, a subject of controversy at the time for its lending to military contractors such as Boeing. The Yippies were met by an estimated 100 riot police who established lookouts within the park and another 300 on standby just outside of the entrance gates. Around 4:00 p.m., many of the Yippies occupied Tom Sawyer Island, purportedly smoking cannabis and causing cast members to halt park guests from boarding rafts to the island. An hour later, the group of Yippies converged at Main Street, U.S.A. and became confrontational with other park guests and riot police after tearing down patriotic bunting while unfurling Viet Cong and Youth International Party flags. Standby riot police entered and the park was evacuated around 5:00 p.m. when some of the insurgents approached the park's Bank of America branch, sparking concern that the building could be burned in a similar fashion to the arson of a Bank of America in Isla Vista in February 1970. Police arrested 23 park guests and it was only the second unexpected early closure in park history, the first being in response to the assassination of John F. Kennedy in 1963. The incident was cited as a clash of the park management's perceived appeal to tradition following the death of Walt Disney and the growing counterculture movement among young people in the United States.

Despite the opening of the more expansive Walt Disney World resort in 1971, Disneyland continued to set attendance records and maintained its status as a major tourist attraction. In 1972, the Bear Country land was opened and the Main Street Electrical Parade was introduced.

Disneyland underwent several changes in preparation for the United States Bicentennial. In 1974, Walt Disney's Carousel of Progress was replaced with America Sings, an audio-animatronic theater show featuring the history of American music. America on Parade debuted in 1975 and ran through 1976 in celebration of the bicentennial.

Several of the park's earliest attractions received major changes or were replaced in the mid-to-late 1970s. The Flight to the Moon attraction was rethemed as Mission to Mars in March 1975, five years after Apollo 11 had successfully landed humans on the moon. Construction of Space Mountain began that same year adjacent to the new Mission to Mars attraction but was delayed by El Niño-related weather complications. The ride opened in 1977 to much acclaim as lines would often stretch all the way to Main Street, U.S.A. The final major change of the decade came in 1977 when the slow-paced Mine Train Through Nature's Wonderland was closed and replaced by the similarly-themed Big Thunder Mountain Railroad rollercoaster in 1979.

1980s
Fantasyland was closed for refurbishment in 1982 and reopened to the public in 1983 as "New Fantasyland."

On December 5, 1985, to celebrate Disneyland's 30th year in operation, one million balloons were launched along the streets bordering Disneyland as part of the Skyfest Celebration.

1990s
In the late 1990s, work began to expand the one-park, one-hotel property. Disneyland Park, the Disneyland Hotel, the site of the original parking lot, and acquired surrounding properties were earmarked to become part of the Disneyland Resort. At that time, the property saw the addition of the Disney California Adventure theme park, a shopping, dining and entertainment complex named Downtown Disney, a remodeled Disneyland Hotel, the construction of Disney's Grand Californian Hotel & Spa, and the acquisition and re-branding of the Pan Pacific Hotel as Disney's Paradise Pier Hotel. The park was renamed "Disneyland Park" to distinguish it from the larger complex under construction. Because the existing parking lot (south of Disneyland) was repurposed by these projects, the six-level, 10,250-space Mickey and Friends parking structure was constructed in the northwest corner. Upon completion in 2000, it was the largest parking structure in the United States.

The park's management team during the mid-1990s was a source of controversy among fans and employees. In an effort to boost profits, various changes were begun by then-executives Cynthia Harriss and Paul Pressler. While their initiatives provided a short-term increase in shareholder returns, they drew widespread criticism for their lack of foresight. The retail backgrounds of Harriss and Pressler led to a gradual shift in Disneyland's focus from attractions to merchandising. Outside consultants McKinsey & Company were brought in to help streamline operations, resulting in many changes and cutbacks. After nearly a decade of deferred maintenance, the original park was showing signs of neglect. Fans of the park decried the perceived decline in customer value and park quality and rallied for the dismissal of the management team.

21st century

Matt Ouimet, the former president of the Disney Cruise Line, was promoted to assume leadership of the Disneyland Resort in late 2003. Shortly afterward, he selected Greg Emmer as Senior Vice President of Operations. Emmer was a long-time Disney cast member who had worked at Disneyland in his youth prior to moving to Florida and held multiple executive leadership positions at the Walt Disney World Resort. Ouimet quickly set about reversing certain trends, especially concerning cosmetic maintenance and a return to the original infrastructure maintenance schedule, in hopes of restoring Disneyland's former safety record. Similarly to Disney himself, Ouimet and Emmer could often be seen walking the park during business hours with members of their respective staff, wearing cast member name badges, standing in line for attractions, and welcoming guests' comments. In July 2006, Ouimet left The Walt Disney Company to become president of Starwood. Soon after, Ed Grier, executive managing director of Walt Disney Attractions Japan, was named president of the resort. In October 2009, Grier announced his retirement, and was replaced by George Kalogridis.

The "Happiest Homecoming on Earth" was an eighteen-month-long celebration (held through 2005 and 2006) of the fiftieth anniversary of Disneyland Park, also celebrating Disneyland's milestone throughout Disney parks worldwide. In 2004, the park underwent major renovations in preparation, restoring many attractions, notably Space Mountain, Jungle Cruise, the Haunted Mansion, Pirates of the Caribbean, and Walt Disney's Enchanted Tiki Room. Attractions that had been in the park on opening day had one ride vehicle painted gold, and the park was decorated with fifty Golden Mickey Ears. The celebration started on May 5, 2005, and ended on September 30, 2006, and was followed by the "Year of a Million Dreams" celebration, lasting twenty-seven months and ending on December 31, 2008.

Beginning on January 1, 2010, Disney Parks hosted the Give a Day, Get a Disney Day volunteer program, in which Disney encouraged people to volunteer with a participating charity and receive a free Disney Day at either a Disneyland Resort or Walt Disney World park. On March 9, 2010, Disney announced that it had reached its goal of one million volunteers and ended the promotion to anyone who had not yet registered and signed up for a specific volunteer situation.

In July 2015, Disneyland celebrated its 60th Diamond Celebration anniversary. Disneyland Park introduced the Paint the Night parade and Disneyland Forever fireworks show, and Sleeping Beauty Castle is decorated in diamonds with a large "60" logo. The Diamond Celebration concluded in September 2016 and the whole decoration of the anniversary was removed around Halloween 2016.

Disneyland Park, along with Disney California Adventure, Downtown Disney, and the resort hotels, closed indefinitely starting March 14, 2020, in response to the coronavirus pandemic. After nearly four months of closure, Downtown Disney reopened on July 9, 2020. The parks had been scheduled to reopen on Disneyland's 65th anniversary on July 17, 2020, but due to rising cases in California, the parks' reopening was once again postponed. It was expected to stay closed until at least December 31, 2020. In February 2021, Disneyland announced a limited-capacity ticketed event called “A Touch of Disney”, which would offer guests to shop at stores and enjoy eateries around the park from March 18 through April 19, 2021. On March 5, 2021, it was announced by the California Department of Public Health that Disneyland could reopen with capacity restrictions beginning April 1, 2021. The following week, Disney CEO Bob Chapek said that the company is planning on officially reopening the park in late April 2021. Disneyland along with Disney California Adventure officially reopened on April 30, 2021, with limited capacity and social distancing/mask guidelines in effect. The following week, the company announced a plan titled DisneylandForward to expand the park with more rides, restaurants, and shops with The Anaheim City Council expected to receive the development plans for approval by 2023. On June 15, 2021, Disneyland, Disney California Adventure and other theme parks in California were permitted to return to full capacity with most Covid-19 pandemic restrictions lifted per California governor Gavin Newsom's Blueprint for a Safer Economy phased re-opening. Prior to this, Disneyland was operating at reduced guest capacity since it re-opened on April 30, 2021, after 13 months of closure due to the pandemic.

On January 27, 2023, Disneyland kicked off the year-long celebration of the centennial of The Walt Disney Company, Disney100. Disneyland Park introduced the Mickey & Minnie's Runaway Railway attraction and Wondrous Journeys fireworks show. Disney California Adventure introduced a new iteration of World of Color, World of Color - ONE.

Park layout and attractions 

The park opened with Main Street, U.S.A., Adventureland, Frontierland, Fantasyland, and Tomorrowland, and has since added New Orleans Square in 1966, Bear Country (now known as Critter Country) in 1972, and Mickey's Toontown in 1993, and Star Wars: Galaxy's Edge in 2019. In 1957, Holidayland opened to the public with a  recreation area including a circus and baseball diamond, but was closed in late 1961. It is often referred to as the "lost" land of Disneyland. Throughout the park are "Hidden Mickeys", representations of Mickey Mouse heads inserted subtly into the design of attractions and environmental decor. An elevated berm supports the  narrow gauge Disneyland Railroad that circumnavigates the park.

Main Street, U.S.A.

Main Street, U.S.A. is patterned after a typical Midwest town of the early 20th century, and took much inspiration from Walt Disney's hometown, Marceline, Missouri. Main Street, U.S.A. has a train station, town square, movie theater, city hall, firehouse with a steam-powered pump engine, emporium, shops, arcades, double-decker bus, horse-drawn streetcar, and jitneys. Main Street is also home to the Disney Art Gallery and the Opera House which showcases Great Moments with Mr. Lincoln, a show featuring an Audio-Animatronic version of the president. At the far end of Main Street, U.S.A. is Sleeping Beauty Castle, the Partners statue, and the Central Plaza (also known as the Hub), which is a portal to most of the themed lands: the entrance to Fantasyland is by way of a drawbridge across a moat and through the castle. Adventureland, Frontierland, and Tomorrowland are on both sides of the castle. Several lands are not directly connected to the Central Plaza—namely, New Orleans Square, Critter Country, Star Wars: Galaxy's Edge and Mickey's Toontown.

The design of Main Street, U.S.A. uses the technique of forced perspective to create an illusion of height. Buildings along Main Street are built at  scale on the first level, then  on the second story, and  scale on the third—reducing the scale by  each level up.

Adventureland

Adventureland is designed to recreate the feel of an exotic tropical place in a far-off region of the world. "To create a land that would make this dream reality", said Walt Disney, "we pictured ourselves far from civilization, in the remote jungles of Asia and Africa." Attractions include opening day's Jungle Cruise, the Indiana Jones Adventure, and Tarzan's Treehouse, which is a conversion of Swiss Family Treehouse from the Walt Disney film Swiss Family Robinson. Walt Disney's Enchanted Tiki Room which is located at the entrance to Adventureland was the first feature attraction to employ Audio-Animatronics, a computer synchronization of sound and robotics.

New Orleans Square

New Orleans Square is based on 19th-century New Orleans, opened on July 24, 1966. It is home to Pirates of the Caribbean and the Haunted Mansion, with nighttime entertainment Fantasmic!. This area is the home of the private Club 33.

Frontierland

Frontierland recreates the setting of pioneer days along the American frontier. According to Walt Disney, "All of us have cause to be proud of our country's history, shaped by the pioneering spirit of our forefathers. Our adventures are designed to give you the feeling of having lived, even for a short while, during our country's pioneer days." Frontierland is home to the Pinewood Indians band of animatronic Native Americans, who live on the banks of the Rivers of America. Entertainment and attractions include Big Thunder Mountain Railroad, the Mark Twain Riverboat, the Sailing Ship Columbia, Pirate's Lair on Tom Sawyer Island, and Frontierland Shootin' Exposition. Frontierland is also home to the Golden Horseshoe Saloon, an Old West-style show palace.

Critter Country

Critter Country opened in 1972 as "Bear Country", and was renamed in 1988. Formerly the area was home to Indian Village, where indigenous tribespeople demonstrated their dances and other customs. Today, the main draw of the area is Splash Mountain, a log-flume journey based on the animated segments of Disney's 1946 film Song of the South. In 2003, a dark ride called The Many Adventures of Winnie the Pooh replaced the Country Bear Jamboree, which closed in 2001.

Star Wars: Galaxy's Edge 

Star Wars: Galaxy's Edge is set within the Star Wars universe, in the Black Spire Outpost village on the remote frontier planet of Batuu. Attractions include the Millennium Falcon: Smugglers Run and Star Wars: Rise of the Resistance. The land opened in 2019, replacing Big Thunder Ranch and former backstage areas.

Fantasyland

Fantasyland is the area of Disneyland of which Walt Disney said, "What youngster has not dreamed of flying with Peter Pan over moonlit London, or tumbling into Alice's nonsensical Wonderland? In Fantasyland, these classic stories of everyone's youth have become realities for youngsters – of all ages – to participate in." Fantasyland was originally styled in a medieval European fairground fashion, but its 1983 refurbishment turned it into a Bavarian village. Attractions include several dark rides, the King Arthur Carrousel, and various family attractions. Fantasyland has the most fiber optics in the park; more than half of them are in Peter Pan's Flight. Sleeping Beauty's Castle features a walk-through storytelling of Briar Rose's adventure as Sleeping Beauty. The attraction opened in 1959, was redesigned in 1972, closed in 1992 for reasons of security and the new installation of pneumatic ram firework shell mortars for "Believe, There's Magic in the Stars", and reopened 2008 with new renditions and methods of storytelling and the restored work of Eyvind Earle.

Mickey's Toontown

Mickey's Toontown opened in 1993 and was partly inspired by the fictional Los Angeles suburb of Toontown in the Touchstone Pictures 1988 release Who Framed Roger Rabbit. Mickey's Toontown is based on a 1930s cartoon aesthetic and is home to Disney's most popular cartoon characters. Toontown features two main attractions: Gadget's Go Coaster (reopening on March 19, 2023, as Chip and Dale's Gadget Coaster) and Roger Rabbit's Car Toon Spin. The "city" is also home to cartoon character's houses such as the house of Mickey Mouse, Minnie Mouse and Goofy, as well as Donald Duck's boat. The  gauge Jolly Trolley was removed during the 2022-23 refurbishment. On January 27, 2023, Mickey & Minnie's Runaway Railway opened in Mickey's Toontown. Half of the land remained closed for refurbishment and reopened on March 19, 2023.

Tomorrowland

During the 1955 inauguration, Walt Disney dedicated Tomorrowland with these words: "Tomorrow can be a wonderful age. Our scientists today are opening the doors of the Space Age to achievements that will benefit our children and generations to come. The Tomorrowland attractions have been designed to give you an opportunity to participate in adventures that are a living blueprint of our future."

Disneyland producer Ward Kimball had rocket scientists Wernher von Braun, Willy Ley, and Heinz Haber serve as technical consultants during the original design of Tomorrowland. Initial attractions included Rocket to the Moon, Astro-Jets and Autopia; later, the first incarnation of the Submarine Voyage was added. The area underwent a major transformation in 1967 to become New Tomorrowland, and then again in 1998 when its focus was changed to present a "retro-future" theme reminiscent of the illustrations of Jules Verne.

Current attractions include Space Mountain, Star Wars Launch Bay, Autopia, Jedi Training: Trials of the Temple, the Disneyland Monorail Tomorrowland Station, Astro Orbitor, and Buzz Lightyear Astro Blasters. Finding Nemo Submarine Voyage opened on June 11, 2007, resurrecting the original Submarine Voyage which closed in 1998. Star Tours was closed in July 2010 and replaced with Star Tours–The Adventures Continue in June 2011.

Operations

Backstage

Major buildings backstage include the Frank Gehry-designed Team Disney Anaheim, where most of the division's administration currently works, as well as the Old Administration Building, behind Tomorrowland.

Photography is forbidden in these areas, both inside and outside, although some photos have found their way to a variety of web sites. Guests who attempt to explore backstage are warned and often escorted from the property.

Transportation

Walt Disney had a longtime interest in transportation, and trains in particular. Disney's passion for the "iron horse" led to him building a miniature live steam backyard railroad—the "Carolwood Pacific Railroad"—on the grounds of his Holmby Hills estate. Throughout all the iterations of Disneyland during the 17 or so years when Disney was conceiving it, one element remained constant: a train encircling the park. The primary designer for the park transportation vehicles was Bob Gurr who gave himself the title of Director of Special Vehicle Design in 1954.

Encircling Disneyland and providing a grand circle tour is the Disneyland Railroad (DRR), a  narrow gauge short-line railway consisting of five oil-fired and steam-powered locomotives, in addition to three passenger trains and one passenger-carrying freight train. Originally known as the Disneyland and Santa Fe Railroad, the DRR was presented by the Atchison, Topeka and Santa Fe Railway until 1974. From 1955 to 1974, the Santa Fe Rail Pass was accepted in lieu of a Disneyland "D" coupon. With a  gauge, the most common narrow track gauge used in North America, the track runs in a continuous loop around Disneyland through each of its realms. Each 1900s-era train departs Main Street Station on an excursion that includes scheduled station stops at: New Orleans Square Station; Toontown Depot; and Tomorrowland Station. The Grand Circle Tour then concludes with a visit to the "Grand Canyon/Primeval World" dioramas before returning passengers to Main Street, U.S.A.

One of Disneyland's signature attractions is its Disneyland Monorail System monorail service, which opened in Tomorrowland in 1959 as the first daily-operating monorail train system in the Western Hemisphere. The monorail guideway has remained almost exactly the same since 1961, aside from small alterations while Indiana Jones Adventure was being built. Five generations of monorail trains have been used in the park since their lightweight construction means they wear out quickly. The most recent operating generation, the Mark VII, was installed in 2008. The monorail shuttles visitors between two stations, one inside the park in Tomorrowland and one in Downtown Disney. It follows a  route designed to show the park from above. Currently, the Mark VII is running with the colors red, blue and orange. The monorail was originally a loop built with just one station in Tomorrowland. Its track was extended and a second station opened at the Disneyland Hotel in 1961. With the creation of Downtown Disney in 2001, the new destination is Downtown Disney, instead of the Disneyland Hotel. The physical location of the monorail station did not change, but the original station building was demolished as part of the hotel downsizing, and the new station is now separated from the hotel by several Downtown Disney buildings, including ESPN Zone and the Rainforest Café.

All of the vehicles found on Main Street, U.S.A., grouped together as the Main Street Vehicles attraction, were designed to accurately reflect turn-of-the-century vehicles, including a  gauge tramway featuring horse-drawn streetcars, a double-decker bus, a fire engine, and an automobile. They are available for one-way rides along Main Street, U.S.A. The horse-drawn streetcars are also used by the park entertainment, including The Dapper Dans. The horseless carriages are modeled after cars built in 1903 and are two-cylinder, four-horsepower (3 kW) engines with manual transmission and steering. Walt Disney used to drive the fire engine around the park before it opened, and it has been used to host celebrity guests and in the parades. Most of the original main street vehicles were designed by Bob Gurr.

From the late 1950s to 1968, Los Angeles Airways provided regularly scheduled helicopter passenger service between Disneyland and Los Angeles International Airport (LAX) and other cities in the area. The helicopters initially operated from Anaheim/Disneyland Heliport, located behind Tomorrowland. Service later moved, in 1960, to a new heliport north of the Disneyland Hotel. Arriving guests were transported to the Disneyland Hotel via tram. The service ended after two fatal crashes in 1968: The crash in Paramount, California, on May 22, 1968, killed 23 (the worst helicopter accident in aviation history at that time). The second crash in Compton, California, on August 14, 1968, killed 21.

Effects on commercial aviation 
The United States Federal Aviation Administration has declared a zone of prohibited airspace around both Disneyland and some of the surrounding areas at Sleeping Beauty Castle. No aircraft, including recreational and commercial drones, are permitted to fly within this zone; this level is only shared with Walt Disney World, other pieces of critical infrastructure (military bases, Pantex) in the United States and whenever the President of the United States travels outside of Washington, D.C.

Live entertainment

In addition to the attractions, Disneyland provides live entertainment throughout the park. Most of the mentioned entertainment is not offered daily, but only on selected days of the week, or selected periods of the year.

Many Disney characters can be found throughout the park, greeting visitors, interacting with children, and posing for photos. Some characters have specific areas where they are scheduled to appear, but can be found wandering as well. Some of the rarest are characters like Rabbit (from Winnie-the-Pooh), Max, Mushu, and Agent P. Periodically through recent decades (and most recently during the summers of 2005 and 2006), Mickey Mouse would climb the Matterhorn attraction several times a day with the support of Minnie, Goofy, and other performers. Other mountain climbers could also be seen on the Matterhorn from time to time. As of March 2007, Mickey and his "toon" friends no longer climb the Matterhorn but the climbing program continues. Every evening at dusk, there is a military-style flag retreat to lower the U.S. Flag by a ceremonial detail of Disneyland's Security staff. The ceremony is usually held between 4:00 and 5:00 pm, depending on the entertainment being offered on Main Street, U.S.A., to prevent conflicts with crowds and music. Disney does report the time the Flag Retreat is scheduled on its Times Guide, offered at the entrance turnstiles and other locations. The Disneyland Band, which has been part of the park since its opening, plays the role of the Town Band on Main Street, U.S.A. It also breaks out into smaller groups like the Main Street Strawhatters, the Hook and Ladder Co., and the Pearly Band in Fantasyland. However, on March 31, 2015, the Disneyland Resort notified the band members of an "end of run". The reason for doing so is that they would start a new higher energy band. The veteran band members were invited to audition for the new Disneyland band and were told that even if they did not make the new band or audition, they would still play in small groups around the park. This sparked some controversy with supporters of the traditional band.

Parades
Disneyland has featured a number of different parades traveling down the park's central Main Street – Fantasyland corridor. There have been daytime and nighttime parades that celebrated Disney films or seasonal holidays with characters, music, and large floats. One of the most popular parades was the Main Street Electrical Parade, which recently ended a limited-time return engagement after an extended run at the Magic Kingdom at Walt Disney World in Lake Buena Vista, Florida. From May 5, 2005, through November 7, 2008, as part of Disneyland's 50th anniversary, "Walt Disney's Parade of Dreams" was presented, celebrating several Disney films including The Lion King, The Little Mermaid, Alice in Wonderland, and Pinocchio. In 2009, "Walt Disney's Parade of Dreams" was replaced by "Celebrate! A Street Party", which premiered on March 27, 2009. Disney did not call "Celebrate! A Street Party" a parade, but rather a "street event." During the Christmas season, Disneyland presents "A Christmas Fantasy" Parade. "Walt Disney's Parade of Dreams" was replaced by "Mickey's Soundsational Parade", which debuted on May 27, 2011. Disneyland debuted a new nighttime parade called "Paint the Night", on May 22, 2015, as part of the park's 60th anniversary. For two weeks in 2020 before the closure due to the COVID-19 pandemic, the parade "Magic Happens" debuted. There was also a virtual parade available for a limited time. At D23 Expo 2022, it was announced that "Magic Happens" would return to Disneyland in spring 2023.

Fireworks shows

Elaborate fireworks shows synchronized with Disney songs and often have appearances from Tinker Bell (and other characters) flying in the sky above Sleeping Beauty Castle. Since 2000, presentations have become more elaborate, featuring new pyrotechnics, launch techniques, and story lines. In 2004, Disneyland introduced a new air launch pyrotechnics system, reducing ground-level smoke and noise and decreasing negative environmental impacts. At the time the technology debuted, Disney announced it would donate the patents to a non-profit organization for use throughout the industry. Projection mapping technology debuted on It's a Small World with the creation of The Magic, the Memories and You in 2011, and expanded to Main Street and Sleeping Beauty Castle in 2015 with the premiere of Disneyland Forever.
 Regular fireworks shows:
 1958–1999; 2015: Fantasy in the Sky
 2000–2004: Believe... There's Magic in the Stars
 2004–2005: Imagine... A Fantasy in the Sky
 2005–2014; 2017–2019: Remember... Dreams Come True
 2009–2014 (summer): Magical: Disney's New Nighttime Spectacular of Magical Celebrations
 2019 and 2022 (summer): Disneyland Forever
Seasonal fireworks shows:
 September to October: Halloween Screams
 Independence Day Week: Disney's Celebrate America: A 4th of July Concert in the Sky
 November to January: Believe... In Holiday Magic
 Limited edition fireworks shows
 60th Anniversary: Disneyland Forever
 Pixar Fest: Together Forever
 Get Your Ears On – A Mickey and Minnie Celebration: Mickey's Mix Magic
 Disney100: Wondrous Journeys

Since 2009, Disneyland has moved to a rotating repertoire of firework spectaculars.

Scheduling of fireworks shows depends on the time of year. During the slower off-season periods, the fireworks are only offered on weekends. During the busier times, Disney offers additional nights. The park offers fireworks nightly during its busy periods, which include Easter/Spring Break, Summer and Christmas time. Disneyland spends about $41,000 per night on the fireworks show. The show is normally offered at 8:45 or 9:30 pm if the park is scheduled to close at 10 pm or later, but shows have started as early as 5:45 pm. A major consideration is the weather and wind, especially at higher altitude, which can force the delay or cancellation of the show. In response to this, alternate versions of the fireworks spectaculars have been created in recent years, solely using the projections and lighting effects. With a few minor exceptions, such as July 4 and New Year's Eve, shows must finish by 10:00 pm due to the conditions of the permit issued by the City of Anaheim.

In recent years, Disneyland uses smaller and mid-sized fireworks shells and more low-level pyrotechnics on the castle to allow guests to enjoy the fireworks spectaculars even if there is a weather issue such as high wind. This precedent is known as B-show. The first fireworks show to have this format was Believe... In Holiday Magic from the 2018 holiday season.

Attendance

Tickets

From Disneyland's opening day until 1982, the price of the attractions was in addition to the price of park admission. Guests paid a small admission fee to get into the park, but admission to most of the rides and attractions required guests to purchase tickets, either individually or in a book, that consisted of several coupons, initially labeled "A" through "C". "A" coupons allowed admission to the smaller rides and attractions such as the Main Street Vehicles, whereas "C" coupons were used for the most common attractions like Peter Pan's Flight, or the Mad Tea Party. As more thrilling rides were introduced, such as the Disneyland Monorail or the Matterhorn Bobsleds, "D" and then eventually "E" coupons were introduced. Coupons could be combined to equal the equivalent of another ticket (e.g., two "A" tickets equal one "B" ticket). The term E ticket attraction is still used to refer to these most in-demand attractions, even though the coupons themselves are long consigned to history.

Disneyland later featured a "Keys to the Kingdom" booklet of tickets, which consisted of 10 unvalued coupons sold for a single flat rate. These coupons could be used for any attraction regardless of its regular value.

In 1982, Disney dropped the idea for individual ride tickets, replacing them with "passports", charging a single admission price with unlimited access to all attractions, "except shooting galleries". While this idea was not original to Disney, it had business advantages: in addition to guaranteeing that everyone paid the same entry amount regardless of their length of stay or number of rides ridden, the park no longer had to print ride tickets, provide staff for ticket booths, nor provide staff to collect tickets or monitor attractions for people sneaking on without tickets. Later, Disney introduced other entry options such as multi-day passes, Annual Passes (which allow unlimited entry to the Park for an annual fee), and Southern California residents' discounts.

In February 2016, Disneyland adopted a demand-based pricing system for single-day admission, charging different prices for "value", "regular", and "peak" days, based on projected attendance. Approximately 30% of days will be designated as "value", mainly weekdays when school is in session, 44% will be designated as "regular", and 26% will be designated as "peak", mostly during holidays and weekends in July. In February 2020, Disneyland switched to a multi-tiered system, initially with 5 pricing tiers, with approximately 64% of days being in Tier 4 and above. A sixth tier was added in October 2021.

 Before 1982, passport tickets were available to groups only.

Closures
Disneyland has had six unscheduled closures:
 In 1963, following the assassination of John F. Kennedy.
 In 1970, due to an anti-Vietnam riot instigated by the Youth International Party.
 In 1987, on December 16 due to a winter storm.
 In 1992, on December 7 due to a winter storm.
 In 2001, after the September 11 attacks.
 In 2020–2021, in response to the COVID-19 pandemic and safety protocols, the park closed on March 14, 2020 and reopened on April 30, 2021.

Additionally, Disneyland has had numerous planned closures:
 In the early years, the park was often scheduled to be closed on Mondays and Tuesdays during the off-season. This was in conjunction with nearby Knott's Berry Farm, which closed on Wednesdays and Thursdays to keep costs down for both parks, while offering Orange County visitors a place to go seven days a week.
 On May 4, 2005, for the 50th Anniversary Celebration media event.
 The park has closed early to accommodate various special events, such as special press events, tour groups, VIP groups, and private parties. It is common for a corporation to rent the entire park for the evening. In such cases, special passes are issued which are valid for admission to all rides and attractions. At the ticket booths and on published schedules, regular guests are notified of the early closures. In the late afternoon, cast members announce that the park is closing, then clear the park of everyone without the special passes. In addition, the park has closed early for inclement weather.

Promotions
Every year in October, Disneyland has a Halloween promotion. During this promotion, or as Disneyland calls it a "party", areas in the park are decorated in a Halloween theme. Space Mountain and the Haunted Mansion are temporarily re-themed as part of the promotion. A Halloween party is offered on selected nights in late September and October for a separate fee, with a special fireworks show that is only shown at the party.

From early November until the beginning of January, the park is decorated for the holidays. Seasonal entertainment includes the Believe... In Holiday Magic firework show and A Christmas Fantasy Parade, while the Haunted Mansion and It's a Small World are temporarily redecorated in a holiday theme. The Sleeping Beauty Castle is snow-capped and decorated with colorful lights during the holidays.

Further reading

See also

List of Disney theme park attractions
List of Disney attractions that were never built
Incidents at Disneyland Resort
Rail transport in Walt Disney Parks and Resorts
Dapper Day
C. V. Wood
Beverly Park

Theme parks that were closely themed to Disneyland
Beijing Shijingshan Amusement Park – Mainland Chinese theme park
Nara Dreamland – Now-defunct Japanese theme park

Theme parks built by former Disneyland employee C. V. Wood
 Freedomland U.S.A.
 Heritage Square in Golden, Colorado
 Pleasure Island

References
Notes

External links

 
 
Opening Day at Disneyland: Photos from 1955

 
1955 establishments in California
Amusement parks in California
Buildings and structures in Anaheim, California
Disneyland Resort
Works based on fairy tales
Landmarks in California
Tourist attractions in Anaheim, California
Walt Disney Parks and Resorts
Amusement parks opened in 1955
History of Anaheim, California